Ugo Lombardi (19 July 1911 – 6 July 2002) was an Italian cinematographer known for his work in Brazilian cinema. He also directed two films. He was the father of the actress Bruna Lombardi.

Selected filmography
 Pietro Micca (1938)
 No Man's Land (1939)
 The Hussar Captain (1940)
 Honeymoon (1941)
 Lucky Night (1941)
 Lively Teresa (1943)
 Two Hearts Among the Beasts (1943)
 Desire (1946)
 Guarany (1948)
 The Curious Impertinent (1953)
 A Flea on the Scales (1953)

References

Bibliography 
 Bondanella, Peter. The Films of Roberto Rossellini. Cambridge University Press, 1993.

External links 
 

1911 births
2002 deaths
Italian emigrants to Brazil
Italian cinematographers
Italian film directors
Film people from Rome